The 500 won coin is one of the South Korean won coins issued by the Bank of Korea, the central bank of South Korea.

Design 
On the obverse is a Red-crowned crane, one of the migratory birds that lives in South Korea, and the inscription "오백원" (Obaegwon), which means 500 won. On the reverse is the Arabic number "500", which means 500 won, the year of manufacture, and the "한국은행" (Hanguk Eunhaeng), which means the Bank of Korea. The Composition of the coin is Cupronickel (75% copper, 25% nickel), weighs 7.70g, has a diameter of 26.50mm and a thickness of 2.00mm, with 120 reeds carved on the edge. The red-crowned crane drawn on the coin looks like it is flying, which means "second economic leap" and "South Korea leap in the international community".

History 
On January 21, 1982, the Bank of Korea approved a plan to issue 500 won coins to replace the existing 500 won banknotes, and on June 12, 1982, 500 won coins were first issued. On January 15, 1983, the Bank of Korea issued a 1 won coin, 5 won coin, 10 won coin, 50 won coin and 100 won coin that modified the design form to match the 500 won coin.

The Bank of Korea originally planned to issue about 56,000,000 500 won coins in 1998, but canceled them after a campaign to collect coins took place in various regions of South Korea due to the influence of South Korea's request for an IMF bailout on December 3, 1997. Instead, the Bank of Korea has collected large amounts of 500 won coins from various regions of South Korea, while producing only about 8,000 500 won coins for gift sets. For this reason, only about 1,000 of the 500 won coins issued in 1998 are estimated to be circulating on the market, and due to their high scarcity, they are traded at hundreds of thousands of won per coin.

Counterfeiting issues 

In Japan in the late 1990s, South Korean 500 won coins were similar to Japanese 500 yen coins, shape, size, material, and weight (Composition of the Japanese 500 yen coin: Cupronickel (75% copper, 25% nickel), weight: 7.20g, diameter: 26.5mm) and were used for vending machines. The counterfeit South Korean 500 won coins were often weighed down mainly by shaving or drilling holes in the surface of the coins with electric drills, and the criminals used many of the methods of putting counterfeit South Korean 500 won coins into vending machines installed in various regions of Japan and then turning the return lever to change them into Japanese 500 yen coins. Due to these incidents, various regions of Japan have banned the use of 500 yen coins in vending machines for sometime, and in 1999, the Japanese government decided to stop issuing cupronickel 500 yen coins. In 2000, Nickel-brass 500 yen coins (Composition: Nickel-brass (72% copper, 20% zinc, 8% nickel), weight: 7.00g, diameter: 26.5mm) were issued in Japan.

References 

Coins of South Korea
Five-hundred-base-unit coins